Jewish (Ashkenazic) and German occupational surname derived from schenken (to pour out or serve) referring to the medieval profession of cup-bearer or wine server (later also to tavern keeper).  At one time only Jews were allowed to sell alcohol in the Russian empire, which is why Shenk (Russian) and its later surname variants are very common.

People with this surname include:

People
 Adolph Schenck (1803–1878), German teacher and entomologist
 Aubrey Schenck (1908–1999), film producer
 August Friedrich Schenck (1828–1901), German painter
 Carl Alwyn Schenck (1868–1955), German pioneer of forestry in the USA and Europe
 Carl Schenck (1835–1910), German mercantilist and founder of the Carl Schenck Eisengießerei & Waagenfabrik
 Charles Schenck, American socialist
 Ernst-Günther Schenck (1904–1998), German doctor 
 Ferdinand Schureman Schenck (1790–1860), American physician and politician
 Frederik V Schenck van Toutenburg (1503–1580), Dutch bishop
 George Schenck, American screenwriter
 Hal Schenck, American mathematician
 James F. Schenck, (1807–1882), rear Admiral in United States Navy
 Joe Schenck (1891–1930), singer, one of the duo Van and Schenck
 Johannes Schenck (1660–1712), Dutch composer
 John Schenck (1750–1823), New Jersey revolutionary soldier
 John Schenck (Manhasset, NY) (1740–1831), New York state senator
 John I. Schenck (1787–1833), New York politician
 Joseph Schenck (1878–1961), pioneer executive of the American film industry
 Martin Schenck (1848–1918), NY State Engineer and Surveyor 1892–1893
 Martin Schenck von Nydeggen (1543–1589), Dutch soldier of fortune in 80 Years' War.
 Mary Schenck Woolman (1860–1940), pioneer in vocational education (born Mary Schenck)
 Michael Schenck (1876–1948), Justice of the North Carolina Supreme Court 
 Nicholas Schenck (1881–1969), American film industry executive
 Norman C. Schenck, mycologist who described Glomus aggregatum
 Paul Schenck (born 1958), anti-abortion activist
 Paul F. Schenck (1899–1968), U.S. Representative from Ohio
 Robert C. Schenck, American Civil War general and U.S. Congressman
 Robert C. Schenck (politician), Florida, USA politician
 Rocky Schenck, American music video director and photographer
 William Cortenus Schenck (1773–1821), American legislator

Other
 Schenck v. United States 249 U.S. 47 (1919), decision by the U.S. Supreme Court regarding the right to free speech
 Schenck Process is a German manufacturer of industrial equipment

See also
Claus Schenk Graf von Stauffenberg (1907–1944), failed assassin of Adolf Hitler
Schenk
Shenk
Shank (disambiguation)

References